Gonia picea is a Palaearctic species of fly in the family Tachinidae.

Range
Europe, Mongolia, China, Taiwan, Japan, Central Asia, Russia (West Russia & Western & Eastern Siberia), Caucasus.

Hosts
The larvae of Cerapteryx graminis, Xestia xanthographa, Staurophora celsia, Mamestra brassicae, Mythimna comma & Polygonia c-album.

References

Diptera of Europe
Diptera of Asia
Insects described in 1830
Exoristinae